Pro Football Simulation is a 1989 video game published by MicroSearch.

Gameplay
Pro Football Simulation is a game in which professional American football games are simulated in detail. The teams in the game are fictional.

Reception
George G Campbell reviewed Pro Football Simulator for Games International magazine, and gave it a rating of 9 out of 10, and stated that "I thoroughly recommend Pro Football to anyone keen on playing an accurate football simulation. If you know little about American Football when you buy this game, you'll know plenty within a few weeks."

Computer Gaming World noted the game's numerous features and called it "an extremely sophisticated football simulation".

Rick Teverbaugh for Amiga World praised the "realism and authenticity" of the game, stating that "Professional Football Simulation is great fun to play".

References

External links
Pro Football Simulation at Hall of Light

1989 video games
Amiga games